Manne Johnson (born 24 March 1944) is a Swedish sports shooter. He competed in the mixed skeet event at the 1980 Summer Olympics.

References

External links
 

1944 births
Living people
Swedish male sport shooters
Olympic shooters of Sweden
Shooters at the 1980 Summer Olympics
People from Varberg
Sportspeople from Halland County